On 27 January 2011 BBC Radio 1 launched a new extended version of the popular Live Lounge dubbed 'Live Lounge Special with...' or sometimes referred to as 'Live Lounge XL'. The extended live lounge performance differs from the normal performance with an interview at the very beginning of the set rather than at the beginning of each track. Then the artist performs 5 or 6 tracks uninterrupted, which can include a cover.

The first performance was done by Adele.

Performances

2011

2012

References

Live Lounge

pl:Live Lounge